Yuri Viktorovich Barinov (born 31 May 1955) is a former cyclist from the Soviet Union. He competed for the Soviet Union in the 1980 Summer Olympics held in Moscow, Soviet Union in the road race, individual event where he finished in third place.

He won the Peace Race in 1980 and the Tour de Luxembourg in 1981. He also competed in the 1985 Vuelta a España, finishing in 72nd position.

References

1955 births
Living people
People from Vyksa
Russian male cyclists
Soviet male cyclists
Olympic cyclists of the Soviet Union
Olympic bronze medalists for the Soviet Union
Cyclists at the 1980 Summer Olympics
Olympic medalists in cycling
Medalists at the 1980 Summer Olympics
Sportspeople from Nizhny Novgorod Oblast